Limón Indanza Canton is a canton of Ecuador, located in the Morona-Santiago Province.  Its capital is the town of General Leonidas Plaza Gutiérrez.  Its population at the 2001 census was 10,192.

It is located in the southeast of the Ecuador Republic in the Oriente.

References

Cantons of Morona-Santiago Province